Brutal Romantic is the fourth studio album by New Zealand singer-songwriter Brooke Fraser. It was released on 18 November 2014 in Australia, New Zealand, North America and Asia, and in Spring 2015 in Europe. It was produced by Fraser and David Kosten. It was recorded at Kosten's West London studio, and the orchestral parts were recorded at the legendary Abbey Road Studios.

The album's first track "Psychosocial" was released 13 August 2014 as a taster track ahead of the album's first single "Kings & Queens", which was sent to radio 23 September 2014.

Track listing

Charts

References

2014 albums
Brooke Fraser albums
Vagrant Records albums